In Gallo-Roman religion, Sucellus or Sucellos was a god shown carrying a large mallet (or hammer) and an olla (or barrel). Originally a Celtic god, his cult flourished not only among Gallo-Romans, but also to some extent among the neighbouring peoples of Raetia and Britain. He has been associated with agriculture and wine, particularly in the territory of the Aedui.

Sculptures

He is usually portrayed as a middle-aged bearded man wearing a wolf-skin, with a long-handled hammer, or perhaps a beer barrel suspended from a pole. His companion Nantosuelta is sometimes depicted alongside him. When together, they are accompanied by symbols associated with prosperity and domesticity.

In a well-known relief from Sarrebourg, near Metz, Nantosuelta, wearing a long gown, is standing to the left. In her left hand she holds a small house-shaped object with two circular holes and a peaked roof – perhaps a dovecote – on a long pole. Her right hand holds a patera which she is tipping onto a cylindrical altar. To the right Sucellus stands, bearded, in a tunic with a cloak over his right shoulder. He holds his mallet in his right hand and an olla in his left. Above the figures is a dedicatory inscription and below them in very low relief is a raven. This sculpture was dated by Reinach, from the form of the letters, to the end of the first century or start of the second century.

Inscriptions
At least eleven inscriptions to Sucellus are known, mostly from Gaul. One (RIB II, 3/2422.21) is from Eboracum (modern York) in Britain.

In an inscription from Augusta Rauricorum (modern Augst), Sucellus is identified with Silvanus:

In honor(em) / 
d(omus) d(ivinae) deo Su/
cello Silv(ano) / 
Spart(us) l(ocus) d(atus) d(ecreto) d(ecurionum)

The syncretism of Sucellus with Silvanus can also be seen in artwork from Narbonensis.

Roles and Duties
In Italy,  Silvanus was said to protect forests and fields. He presided over the boundaries of properties, together with a host of local silvani, three for each property. These were the silvanus of the home, the silvanus of the fields, and the silvanus of the boundaries. Silvanus also takes care of flocks, guaranteeing their fertility and protecting them from wolves, which is why he often wears the skin of a wolf. When moving north into Gaul, Silvanus was syncretically merged with Sucellus to form the conflated Sucellus-Silvanus. It was Sucellus who carried the mallet and bowl. It has been suggested that the mallet was for construction and the erection of fence-posts (establishing boundaries), but this is far from certain. Green claims that Sucellus may also relate to a chthonic deity, especially in maintain boundaries between the living and dead.

Etymology

In Gaulish, the root cellos can be interpreted as 'striker', derived from Proto-Indo-European *-kel-do-s whence also come Latin per-cellere ('striker'), Greek klao ('to break') and Lithuanian kálti ('to hammer, to forge'). The prefix su- means 'good' or 'well' and is found in many Gaulish personal names. Sucellus is therefore commonly translated as 'the good striker.'

An alternate etymology is offered by Celticist Blanca María Prósper, who posits a derivative of the Proto-Indo-European root *kel- ‘to protect’, i.e. *su-kel-mó(n) "having a good protection" or *su-kel-mṇ-, an agentive formation meaning "protecting well, providing good protection", with a thematic derivative built on the oblique stem, *su-kel-mn-o- (and subsequent simplification and assimilation of the sonorant cluster and a secondary full grade of the root). Prósper suggests the name would then be comparable to the Indic personal name Suśarman-, found in Hindu mythology.

See also
 The Dagda, a similar figure from Irish mythology

References

Further reading

 
 
 
 Heichelheim F. M., Housman J. E. "Sucellus and Nantosuelta in Mediaeval Celtic Mythology". In: L'antiquité classique, Tome 17, fasc. 1, 1948. Miscellanea Philologica Historica et archaelogia in honorem Hvberti Van De Weerd. pp. 305–316. [DOI: https://doi.org/10.3406/antiq.1948.2845] www.persee.fr/doc/antiq_0770-2817_1948_num_17_1_2845
 
 

Agricultural gods
Celtic gods
Deities of wine and beer